Loch Humphrey is a loch in West Dunbartonshire, Scotland. It is fished for mainly perch and occasional trout by members of the Bearsden Angling Club, who have a boat and a boatshed at the loch.

It is in the Kilpatrick Hills, and is close to Duncolm.  It can be reached by a cart track from Old Kilpatrick; the terrain is not difficult going but it is quite a steep climb.

References

Humphrey
Humphrey